Kristen Kelly is an American country music singer from Lorena, Texas. While signed to Arista Nashville she released her debut single, "Ex-Old Man". The song was the first from her self titled ep, produced by Tony Brown and Paul Overstreet. “Ex-Old Man” was the number one most added debut song at country radio for a female artist and was Kelly’s first TOP 30 single. Radio Country Universe gave the song a B+, praising the sound as "back-to-basics". It debuted at number 60 on the Hot Country Songs chart dated May 12, 2012.

That same year Kristen was a member of the first class of female artists inducted into CMT's Next Women of Country campaign which shines a spotlight on the newest ladies of country music.

Kelly has played the Grand Ole Opry and toured with some of country music's biggest names including Brad Paisley's 2012 Virtual Reality World Tour  Rascal Flatts, Alan Jackson, Sheryl Crow, The Band Perry, Willie Nelson, Gary Allan, Dierks Bentley, Jake Owen and more.

Kelly independently released her FIRE ep in 2015 and has released 3 new singles in 2020: “Ashes” which was on Season 7 episode 1 of the Netflix show The Ranch, “Country Music” featuring Craig Campbell and “Thank God For The Neon.”

Discography

Extended plays

Singles

Music videos

References

American women country singers
American country singer-songwriters
Arista Nashville artists
Living people
Singer-songwriters from Texas
Year of birth missing (living people)
People from Lorena, Texas
Country musicians from Texas
21st-century American women